Henryk XI may refer to

 Henry XI, Duke of Głogów (ca. 1435 – 1476)
 Henry XI, Duke of Legnica (1539–1588)